Krapopolis is an upcoming American animated sitcom created by Dan Harmon for the Fox Broadcasting Company. In October 2022, ahead of its premiere, the series was renewed for a second season. In March 2023, it was renewed for a third season.

Premise
The show is set in mythical ancient Greece and centers on a flawed family of humans, gods and monsters trying to run one of the world's first cities without killing each other.

Cast

Main
 Richard Ayoade as Tyrannis
 Matt Berry as Shlub
 Hannah Waddingham as Deliria
 Pam Murphy as Stupendous
 Duncan Trussell as Hippocampus

Recurring
 Dove Cameron
 Tara Strong
 Alanna Ubach
 Stephanie Beatriz

Guest
 Susan Sarandon
 Will Forte
 Michael Urie
 Jane Lynch
 Amber Stevens West
 Yvette Nicole Brown
 Dave Franco

Production
In June 2020, it was announced that Dan Harmon signed a deal with Fox to create a new adult animated comedy for 2022, with a straight-to-series order. This will be Fox Entertainment Studios' first fully owned animated comedy series. In May 2021, it was announced that the series would be titled Krapopolis, and it would be curated on the blockchain, as Fox enters the NFT business.

In June 2021, it was announced that Jordan Young would be the showrunner for the series.

In October 2022, Fox gave the series an early renewal for a second season ahead of its premiere.

In March 2023, the series was renewed for a third season.

References

External links
 
 

2020s American animated comedy television series
2020s American adult animated television series
2020s American sitcoms

American animated sitcoms
American adult animated comedy television series
American flash adult animated television series
Animated television series about families
English-language television shows
Fox Broadcasting Company original programming
Television series set in ancient Greece
Television series by Fox Entertainment
Upcoming animated television series
Television series created by Dan Harmon